Over 1,000 species are currently accepted in the moss genus Bryum:

A
Bryum acuminatissimum - Bryum acutifolium - Bryum aeneum - Bryum aequabile - Bryum afrocalophyllum - Bryum alandense - Bryum albomarginatum - Bryum albopulvinatum - Bryum albulum - Bryum alexandri - Bryum algovicum - Bryum alpiniforme - Bryum alpinum - Bryum altaicum - Bryum altisetum - Bryum amblyacis - Bryum amblyodon - Bryum amblyphyllum - Bryum amentirameum - Bryum anomodon - Bryum apalodictyoides - Bryum apiculatum - Bryum appressifolium - Bryum appressum - Bryum arachnoideum - Bryum archangelicum - Bryum arcticum - Bryum argenteum - Bryum argentisetum - Bryum argyroglyphodon - Bryum ateleostomum - Bryum atenense - Bryum atrovirens - Bryum auricomum - Bryum australe - Bryum austroturbinatum - Bryum axel-blyttii - Bryum axillare

B
Bryum baeuerlenii - Bryum baldwinii - Bryum balticum - Bryum barnesii - Bryum bateae - Bryum bharatiense - Bryum billetii - Bryum blandum - Bryum blindii - Bryum borellii - Bryum bornholmense - Bryum botterii - Bryum bourgeanum - Bryum brachycladulum - Bryum brachyneuron - Bryum brasiliense - Bryum brevicoma - Bryum bulbiferum - Bryum bulbigerum - Bryum bulbillicaule - Bryum bullosum

C
Bryum caespiticium - Bryum calobryoides - Bryum calodictyon - Bryum calophyllum - Bryum campoanum - Bryum campylopodioides - Bryum canariense - Bryum capillatum - Bryum capituliforme - Bryum carbonicola - Bryum cellulare - Bryum cephalozioides - Bryum challaense - Bryum chlororhodon - Bryum chorizodontum - Bryum chryseum - Bryum chrysoneuron - Bryum chrysophyllum - Bryum cirrhiferum - Bryum clavatum - Bryum clintonii - Bryum coelophyllum - Bryum cognatum - Bryum colombi - Bryum coloradense - Bryum comense - Bryum congestiflorum - Bryum conoideo-operculatum - Bryum coronatum - Bryum crassimucronatum - Bryum crassinervum - Bryum crassum - Bryum creberrimum - Bryum cremocarpum - Bryum cristatum - Bryum crozetense - Bryum curvatum - Bryum cyathiphyllum - Bryum cyclophyllum - Bryum cylindrothecium

D
Bryum daenikeri - Bryum deciduum - Bryum defractum - Bryum delitescens - Bryum demaretianum - Bryum densifolium - Bryum dentatum - Bryum denticulatinervium - Bryum depressum - Bryum diaphanum - Bryum dichotomum - Bryum dilatatum - Bryum dillenii - Bryum dimorphum - Bryum dissolutinerve - Bryum dixonii - Bryum dolichophyllum - Bryum donatii - Bryum dongolense - Bryum donianum - Bryum dunense - Bryum duplicatum

E

Bryum eatonii - Bryum ehlei - Bryum ekmanii - Bryum ekstamii - Bryum elegans - Bryum elegantulum - Bryum ellipsifolium - Bryum ellipticifolium - Bryum elwendicum - Bryum encalyptaceum - Bryum enisseense - Bryum eremaeum - Bryum erythrocaulon - Bryum erythroloma - Bryum erythrotropis - Bryum euryphyllum - Bryum evanidinerve

F
Bryum fabronia - Bryum felipponei - Bryum flaccidifolium - Bryum flaccidum - Bryum flagellans - Bryum flagellicoma - Bryum flavipes - Bryum flavituber - Bryum flavopallidum - Bryum fragile - Bryum francii - Bryum funckiioides - Bryum funkii - Bryum fuscescens - Bryum fuscomucronatum - Bryum fuscotomentosum

G
Bryum gamophyllum - Bryum garovaglii - Bryum gayanum - Bryum gemmascens - Bryum gemmatum - Bryum gemmiferum - Bryum gemmilucens - Bryum gemmiparum - Bryum germainii - Bryum gerwigii - Bryum gilliesii - Bryum gossypinum - Bryum goudotii - Bryum gracilisetum - Bryum gynostomoides - Bryum gyoerffianum

H
Bryum haematoneurum - Bryum hagenii - Bryum handelii - Bryum hatcheri - Bryum hauthalii - Bryum hawaiicum - Bryum hedbergii - Bryum hioramii - Bryum hochreutineri

I
Bryum icodense - Bryum illecebraria - Bryum imbricatum - Bryum inaequale - Bryum incacorralis - Bryum incrassatolimbatum - Bryum innovans - Bryum insolitum - Bryum intermedium - Bryum isleanum

J
Bryum jamaicense - Bryum joannis-meyeri

K
Bryum kerguelense - Bryum klinggraeffii - Bryum knowltonii - Bryum kunzei

L
Bryum labradorense - Bryum laevifilum - Bryum laevigatum - Bryum lagarocarpum - Bryum lamii - Bryum lamprocarpum - Bryum lamprochaete - Bryum lamprocomum - Bryum lamprostegum - Bryum latifolium - Bryum latilimbatum - Bryum lawersianum - Bryum leoni - Bryum leptocaulon - Bryum leptoglyphondon - Bryum leptoneurum - Bryum leptospeiron - Bryum leptotorquescens - Bryum leptotrichum - Bryum leucoglyphodon - Bryum leucophylloides - Bryum limbatum - Bryum limbifolium - Bryum lindbergii - Bryum lisae - Bryum lonchocaulon - Bryum lonchophyllum - Bryum lonchopus - Bryum longisetum - Bryum lorentzii - Bryum ludovicae - Bryum lugubre

M
Bryum maceratum - Bryum macroblastum - Bryum macrodictyum - Bryum macrophyllum - Bryum macrosporum - Bryum mairei - Bryum mamillatum - Bryum marratii - Bryum matto-grossense - Bryum mayrii - Bryum meesioides - Bryum megalacrion - Bryum melvilleanum - Bryum mendax - Bryum meruense - Bryum mesodon - Bryum microcalophyllum - Bryum microcapillare - Bryum microchaeton - Bryum microcochleare - Bryum micronitidum - Bryum mieheanum - Bryum mildeanum - Bryum miniatum - Bryum minusculum - Bryum minutirosatum - Bryum minutissimum - Bryum mirabile - Bryum miserum - Bryum moei - Bryum mollifolium - Bryum molliusculum - Bryum mucronatum - Bryum mucronifolium - Bryum muehlenbeckii - Bryum multiflorum - Bryum murmanicum

N
Bryum nanoapiculatum - Bryum nanocapillare - Bryum nanophyllum - Bryum neodamense - Bryum nitidulum - Bryum nivale

O
Bryum obligogynum - Bryum obliquum - Bryum oblongum - Bryum obscurum - Bryum obtusidens - Bryum ochianum - Bryum oncophorum - Bryum oophyllum - Bryum orbiculatifolium - Bryum orientale - Bryum orthocladum - Bryum orthodontioides - Bryum orthopelma - Bryum orthotheciellae - Bryum orthothecium - Bryum osculatianum - Bryum oxycarpum

P
Bryum pabstianum - Bryum pachycladum - Bryum pachytheca - Bryum pallens - Bryum pallescens - Bryum pallidoviride - Bryum pamirense - Bryum pamiricomucronatum - Bryum pancheri - Bryum papuanum - Bryum paradoxum - Bryum paraguense - Bryum patzeltii - Bryum pauperidens - Bryum peralatum - Bryum perconcavifolium - Bryum perdecurrens - Bryum perlimbatum - Bryum perminutum - Bryum perrieri - Bryum phallus - Bryum picnoloma - Bryum planiusculum - Bryum platyphyllum - Bryum pocsii - Bryum pootenianum - Bryum posthumum - Bryum propium - Bryum prosatherum - Bryum pseudoblandum - Bryum pseudocapillare - Bryum pseudocastaneum - Bryum pseudointermedium - Bryum pseudomicron - Bryum pseudopachytheca - Bryum pseudotriquetrum - Bryum pungentifolium - Bryum purpurascens - Bryum purpuratum - Bryum purpureolucidum - Bryum purpureonigrum - Bryum pycnodictyum - Bryum pycnophyllum - Bryum pygmaeomucronatum - Bryum pygmaeum - Bryum pyrrhothrix

R
Bryum radiculosum - Bryum ramosum - Bryum rapaense - Bryum rectifolium - Bryum recurvulum - Bryum redboonii - Bryum reedii - Bryum remelei - Bryum renauldii - Bryum retusifolium - Bryum revolutum - Bryum rhexodon - Bryum rhizoblastum - Bryum rhypariocaulon - Bryum richardsii - Bryum riparioides - Bryum riparium - Bryum rivale - Bryum roscheri - Bryum rosulans - Bryum rotundifolium - Bryum rubens - Bryum rubescens - Bryum rubicundum - Bryum rubrocostatum - Bryum rubrolimbatum - Bryum ruderale - Bryum rufolimbatum - Bryum russulum - Bryum rutilans

S
Bryum sabuletorum - Bryum salakense - Bryum salinum - Bryum sandii - Bryum sauteri - Bryum savesii - Bryum savicziae - Bryum schleicheri - Bryum sclerodictyon - Bryum semirubrum - Bryum serotinum - Bryum sibericum - Bryum simii - Bryum sinense - Bryum skottsbergii - Bryum soboliferum - Bryum sordidum - Bryum spinifolium - Bryum spininervium - Bryum splachnobryoides - Bryum splendidifolium - Bryum stellituber - Bryum stenocarpum - Bryum stenophyllum - Bryum stirtonii - Bryum subapiculatum - Bryum subargenteum - Bryum subcalophyllum - Bryum subclavatum - Bryum subelegans - Bryum subgracillimum - Bryum subleucophyllum - Bryum submucronatum - Bryum subneodamense - Bryum subnitidulum - Bryum subpercurrente - Bryum subrotundifolium - Bryum subsericeum - Bryum sullivanii - Bryum svihlae - Bryum syriacum

T
Bryum taimyrense - Bryum taitae - Bryum taoense - Bryum tenuidens - Bryum tenuifolium - Bryum tenuisetum - Bryum tepintzensa - Bryum teres - Bryum terskeiense - Bryum tessellatum - Bryum thomasii - Bryum thomeanum - Bryum thomsonii - Bryum timmiostomoides - Bryum tisserantii - Bryum tjiburrumense - Bryum tophaceum - Bryum torquatum - Bryum trabutii - Bryum tristaniense - Bryum truncorum - Bryum turbinatum - Bryum turgidum

U
Bryum uliginosum - Bryum urbanskyi - Bryum usambaricum - Bryum utriculatum - Bryum uvidum

V
Bryum valparaisense - Bryum vernicosum - Bryum vernum - Bryum veronense - Bryum versicolor - Bryum viguieri - Bryum violaceum - Bryum viridescens - Bryum voeltzkowii - Bryum vulcanicum

W
Bryum wagneri - Bryum wallaceanum - Bryum warneum - Bryum weigelii - Bryum wrightii

Z
Bryum zeballosicum

References

List
Bryum